This article contains information about the literary events and publications of 1535.

Events
 January 13 – A statute of the Parlement of Paris is enacted forbidding all printing under threat of hanging and closing all bookshops, although it is quickly abandoned.
October 4 – Publication of Myles Coverdale's complete Bible translation into English in Antwerp is completed.
unknown date – The earliest printed book in Estonian, a Catechism with a translation by Johann Koell from the Middle Low German Lutheran text of Simon Wanradt, is printed by Hans Lufft in Wittenberg for use in Tallinn.

New books

Prose
John Bourchier, 2nd Baron Berners – Huon of Burdeuxe
Desiderius Erasmus – Ecclesiastes: sive de ratione concionandi
Simon Wanradt and Johann Koell – Catechism (first book text in Estonian)

Poetry

Births
Thomas North, English translator (died c.1604)
Approximate years
George Gascoigne, English writer, soldier and courtier (died 1577)
Thomas Legge, English dramatist (died 1607)

Deaths
February 7 – Thomas More, English social philosopher, politician and author (born 1478)
October 10 – Pedro Manuel Jiménez de Urrea, Spanish poet and dramatist (born 1485)
Unknown date – Girolamo Angeriano (also "Hieronymus Angerianus"), poet in Italian and Latin (born c. 1470 – 1490)

References

1535

1535 books
Renaissance literature
Early Modern literature
Years of the 16th century in literature